Hexapodidae is a family of crabs, the only family in the superfamily Hexapodoidea. It has traditionally been treated as a subfamily of the family Goneplacidae, and was originally described as a subfamily of Pinnotheridae.  Its members can be distinguished from all other true crabs by the reduction of the thorax, such that only seven sternites are exposed, and only four pairs of pereiopods are present. Not counting the enlarged pair of claws, this leaves only six walking legs, from which the type genus Hexapus, and therefore the whole family, takes its name. Some anomuran "crabs", such as porcelain crabs and king crabs also have only four visible pairs of legs. With the exception of Stevea williamsi, from Mexico, all the extant members are found either in the Indo-Pacific oceans, or around the coast of Africa.

Fossil record
In addition to the extant taxa, the family contains two genera known only from fossils – Goniocypoda and Palaeopinnixa – and two further genera include both living and fossil representatives: Hexapus and Stevea. The family's fossil record extents back certainly as far as the Paleocene, with unverified reports of a species in the Maastrichtian of Senegal.

Genera
The following are the genera included under Hexapodidae:

Bellhexapus De Angeli, Guinot, & Garassino, 2010
Eohexapus De Angeli, Guinot, & Garassino, 2010
Eurohexapus De Angeli, Guinot, & Garassino, 2010
Globihexapus Schweitzer & Feldmann, 2001
Goniocypoda Woodward, 1867
Hexalaughlia Guinot, 2006
Hexapinus Manning & Holthuis, 1981
Hexaplax Doflein, 1904
Hexapus De Haan, 1833
Mariaplax Rahayu & Ng, 2014 
Lambdophallus Alcock, 1900
Latohexapus Huang, Hsueh, & Ng, 2002
Paeduma Rathbun, 1897
Palaeopinnixa Via, 1966
Parahexapus Balss, 1922
Pseudohexapus Monod, 1956
Rayapinus Rahayu & Ng, 2014 
Spiroplax Manning & Holthuis, 1981
Stevea Manning & Holthuis, 1981
Thaumastoplax Miers, 1881
Theoxapus Rahayu & Ng, 2014 
Tritoplax Manning & Holthuis, 1981

References

Crabs
Extant Paleocene first appearances
Taxa named by Edward J. Miers
Decapod families